The Giza Solar boat museum was dedicated to display the reconstructed Khufu ship, a solar barque of pharaoh Khufu. It was constructed between 1961 and 1982, just a few meters from where the Khufu ship was found, on the southern side of the Great Pyramid, on the Giza Plateau in Egypt 

It was equipped with modern techniques and technologies to preserve the solar boat. The construction enabled viewing the boat from three different levels. On the ground floor, one could view the bottom of the boat.

The museum was dismantled after the ship was relocated to the Grand Egyptian Museum in August 2021.

Khufu Ship

When the Egyptian antiquities inspector responsible for the area of Giza, Mohamed Zaky Nour, the civil engineer who was in charge of cleaning up the area of the Pyramids of Giza, Kamal el Malakh, and the supervisor of the cleaning process of the area, Doctor Abdel Men'em Aboubakr were finishing their work at the pyramids, they found what seemed to be a wall made out of limestone. After a lot of digging in the ground, they reached the bottom of the wall and found 42 pieces of rock that were divided into two groups to protect them against any outer dangers or harm. On 26 May 1954, the nozzle of the hole where the pieces of the solar boat were opened and everybody who was there smelled the distinctive scent of the cedar wood. The ship was disassembled around the funeral rites into 1224 small pieces before being buried near the pyramids in the boat pit. The ship was fully re-assembled in 1968.

Contents
 Reassembled Khufu ship (now in the Grand Egyptian Museum) 
 A maquette Khufu Solar ship
 Photos of the discovery and reassembling of the ship

Gallery

See also
 Ancient Egyptian solar ships
 Abydos boats
 Ancient Egyptian technology
 Ships preserved in museums

References

External links

 Saudiaramcoworld.com
 Web archive backup: Ships of the World: An Historical Encyclopedia – "Cheops ship"
 A Visitors Perspective of the Khufu Boat Museum
 Supreme Council of Antiquities of Egypt: Khufu Boat Museum

Giza Plateau
Ancient Egyptian ships
Ships preserved in museums
Ship burials